The Glasgow Media Group (also referred to as the Glasgow University Media Group, the GUMG, and the Glasgow Media Unit), is a group of researchers formed at the University of Glasgow in 1974, which pioneered the analysis of television news in a series of studies. Operating under the GUMG banner, academics like its founders Brian Winston, Greg Philo and John Eldridge have consistently argued that television news is biased in favour of powerful forces in society over issues like climate change, conflicts such as Israel/Palestine, Northern Ireland, welfare benefits, economics and refugees.

Impact
In 1982 Really Bad News reached number five on the Glasgow Evening Times best sellers list and other GUMG titles have remained popular on social science courses at universities.

In 1985, BBC Two made an eponymous programme based on War and Peace News as part of their BBC2 Open Space series but before broadcast it removed certain aspects of the programme, including minutes leaked from their own editorial meetings.  As a result, the GUMG secured a screen-card reading CENSORED and another suggesting that viewers write and complain to the BBC's Director General.  The resulting publicity led to the editor of ITN, David Nicholas, attacking the book and to the Observer describing the GUMG as 'academic hit men stalking television's newscasters'.

In 2010 Greg Philo proposed a wealth tax based on a poll of UK population which showed "very strong support, with 74% of the population approving" of the proposal to address inequality, making the case in The Guardian.

In 2011 Emma Briant, Greg Philo and Nick Watson from the Strathclyde Centre for Disability Research published Bad News for Disabled People, which was discussed in the UK and Scottish parliaments and used in evidence in Leveson Inquiry into the British Press. On 14 November 2011, the report was directly cited by Dame Tanni Grey-Thompson in a welfare reform debate in the UK House of Lords as evidence of widespread misrepresentation of disabled people and disability benefits. Also in November 2011, the Shadow Minister for Disability Issues Kate Green MP referred directly to the findings in a UK House of Commons debate on disability hate crime.

In 2012 Catherine Happer and Greg Philo published a collaborative research report with Antony Froggatt of Chatham House examining public beliefs and behaviours on climate change and energy security. They found "widespread confusion" due to media representations and politicization of the issue had resulted in falling media coverage, leading to a lack of trust of political voices on the subject and lack of recognition among the public of the issue's importance.

In 2013 Greg Philo, Emma Briant and Pauline Donald's book Bad News for Refugees a first study of the emerging refugee crisis in the UK media prior to Brexit was included in a Scottish Refugee Council submission to Home Affairs Select Committee Inquiry into Asylum & Media.

Chatham House and Glasgow University Media Group, in a 2015 report titled "Changing Climate, Changing Diets: Pathways to Lower Meat Consumption" also were the first to call for a tax on red meat, known as the Meat Tax.

Members
The Glasgow Media Group is composed of scholars and specialists in the area of communications, many of whom worked originally in the Glasgow University Media Unit whose Research Director was Greg Philo and many who have now retired or moved on.
Past and present members who have published with the group include:
 John Eldridge (sociologist) (Founder, retired Affiliate Research Fellow)
 Brian Winston (Founder, now University of Lincoln)
 Greg Philo (Founder, Director of the Glasgow Media Group)
 Catherine Happer  (current Director of the Glasgow University Media Group)
 David Miller (now University of Bristol)
 Mike Berry (now Cardiff University)
 Emma Briant (now Bard College)
 Rena Bivens (now Carleton University)
 Lesley Henderson
 Giuliana Tiripelli
 Jen Burke

Publications
 Bad News, Routledge and Kegan Paul, 1976.
 More Bad News Routledge and Kegan Paul, 1980.
 Glasgow University Media Group Really Bad News, Writers and Readers, 1982.
 Greg Philo Seeing and Believing, Routledge, 1990
 John Eldridge (Ed.) Getting the Message: News, Truth and Power (Routledge, 1993)
 John Eldridge (Ed.) News Content, Language and Visuals: Glasgow University Media Reader (Communication and Society) (Paperback), Routledge, 1995.
 Greg Philo (Ed.) Industry, Economy, War and Politics: Glasgow University Media Reader: 2 (Communication and Society) (Paperback), Routledge, 1995.
 John Eldridge, J. Kitzinger and K. Williams) The Mass Media and Power in Modern Britain (Oxford University Press,1997)
 David Miller, Jenny Kitzinger, Peter Beharrel and Kevin Williams The Circuit of Mass Communication: Media Strategies, Representation and Audience Reception in the AIDS Crisis, Sage, 1998.
 Greg Philo Message Received (Paperback), Longman, 1999.
 Greg Philo and David Miller Market Killing: What the free market does and what social scientists can do about it (Paperback), Longman, 2000.
 Reporting Child Deaths  by Glasgow Media Group (National Society for the Prevention of Cruelty to Children (NSPCC), 1 February 2001) Paperback
 Greg Philo and Mike Berry Bad News From Israel, Pluto, 2004.
 Greg Philo and Mike Berry More Bad News from Israel, Pluto 2011
 Emma Briant, Greg Philo & Nick Watson Bad News for Disabled People: How the Newspapers are Reporting Disability, Strathclyde Centre for Disability Research and Glasgow Media Unit, University of Glasgow, 2011
 Greg Philo, Emma Briant and Pauline Donald; Bad News for Refugees, Pluto, 2013.
 Laura Wellesley, Catherine Happer, Antony Froggatt, Greg Philo, Changing Climate, Changing Diets: Pathways to Lower Meat Consumption, Chatham House, London, 2015
 Alan MacLeod; Bad News From Venezuela: Twenty Years of Fake News and Misreporting, Routledge, 2018.
 Greg Philo, Mike Berry, Justin Schlosberg, Antony Lerman, David Miller, Bad News For Labour: Antisemitism, the Party and Public Belief, Pluto Press, 2019.
 Catherine Happer, Philip Schlesinger, Ana Langer, Hayes Mabweazara, Dominic Hinde, 'Scotland's Sustainable Media Future: Challenges and Opportunities: a Stakeholder Analysis', University of Glasgow, 2022.

References

University of Glasgow
Mass media in Glasgow
Media coverage of the Arab–Israeli conflict
1974 establishments in Scotland
Migration studies